Andrew Little or Andy Little may refer to:

 Andrew Little (Canadian politician) (1919–1993), Member of the Alberta Legislative Assembly
 Andrew Little (footballer) (born 1989), Northern Irish footballer
 Andrew Little (New Zealand politician) (born 1965), leader of the New Zealand Labour Party (2014–2017)
 Andrew George Little (1863–1945), English historian